Zgornja Pohanca is a settlement in the hills north of Brežice in the Municipality of Brežice in eastern Slovenia. The area is part of the traditional region of Styria. It is now included with the rest of the municipality in the Lower Sava Statistical Region.

There is a small chapel-shrine in the settlement dedicated to the Virgin Mary. It was built in 1898.

References

External links
Zgornja Pohanca on Geopedia

Populated places in the Municipality of Brežice